Red and Yellow Creative School of Business (R&Y) is a business school in Cape Town, South Africa. Founded in 1994, it offers training in management, marketing and design.

History 
The school was founded in 1994 under the name « Red & Yellow School of Logic and Magic ». 26 years later it joined Honoris United Universities.

In 2022, the institution organizes its first summit dedicated to the metaverse. Two years earlier, the school had its first four online degrees accredited.

Expansion 
In 2022, R&Y launches a certificate on the Tunisian market, in partnership with Université Centrale, in Nigeria and in Mauritius.

Partenership 
In 2021, the school announced a partnership with Unilever.

See also 
 Honoris United Universities

References

External links 
 

Business schools in South Africa